This is a list of Italian football transfers for co-ownership resolutions, for the 2008–09 season, from and to Serie A and Serie B.

Summer transfer window

ND – Those player's contract with mother club has terminated and free to join co-owner club.

See also
List of Italian football transfers Summer 2008

References
General
Official Italian Transfer List
Buste
Specific

Italy
Trans
2008